is a private high school located in Tsushima, Aichi Prefecture, Japan.

See also
 South Queensland Academy

References

External links
  Seirinkan High School (Archive)

High schools in Aichi Prefecture
Schools in Aichi Prefecture